Bwanabwana Rural LLG is a local-level government (LLG) of Milne Bay Province, Papua New Guinea. The Bwanabwana language is spoken in the LLG.

Wards
01. Hamama
02. Loani
03. Logea
04. Kwato
05. Tegorauan
06. Gotai
07. Dawson
08. Samarai East
09. Kwaraiwa
10. Sawasawaga
11. Anagusa
12. Samarai North
13. Tubetube
14. Yokowa
15. Gigia
16. Habani
17. Simagahi
18. Ware Island
19. Bedauna
20. Sideia
21. Kuiaro
22. Sekuku
23. Sidudu

See also
 Papua New Guinea
 Outline of Papua New Guinea
 Territory of Papua and New Guinea

References

Local-level governments of Milne Bay Province
Papua New Guinea